HFIP may refer to:

High Frequency Internet Protocol
Hexafluoro-2-propanol
Hurricane Forecast Intensity Project